Changlong may refer to:

 Chimelong Group, or Changlong in Chinese
 Changlong Subdistrict (长龙街道), Changsha County, Hunan province, China
 Changlung, or Changlong, a village in Gonjo County, Tibet Autonomous Region, China
 Changlong, the Chinese name of Chimelong Paradise

See also
Changlong Station (disambiguation)